Mor Dogo Thiam (born May 22, 1941) is a Senegalese drummer, cultural historian, and entertainment consultant. His surname is pronounced "Chahm".

Career
Thiam recorded his first album, Ndende Safarra, in 1974  with B.B. King and Nancy Wilson to help victims of an African drought. The group was invited by President Nixon to perform at the White House in Washington D.C.

In 1999, Thiam recorded his second album Back to Africa.

Personal life
In 2009, Thiam made the Hajj pilgrimage to Mecca and devoted his life to the development of Darou Khafour and building the Mor Thiam Learning Center International School (MTLC).

Thiam resides between Orlando, Florida and Dakar, Senegal, and is the father to singer Aliaune Badara Thiam, more popularly known as Akon.

References

External links
 Mor Thiam page on L'Observatoire Leonardo des Arts et des Techno-Sciences

1941 births
Living people
People from Dakar
Avant-garde jazz musicians
Senegalese drummers
Senegalese Muslims
20th-century drummers
20th-century male musicians
21st-century drummers
21st-century male musicians
University of California, Los Angeles faculty
Southern Illinois University faculty
Morris Brown College faculty